The 2014 Sophia Awards (Portuguese: Prémios Sophia 2014) were the 2014 edition of the Sophia Awards, an award presented by the Portuguese Academy of Cinema to award the best in Portuguese filmmaking. The nominees were announced on September 9 and the award ceremony took place on October 8, 2014 at the Centro Cultural de Belém in Lisbon.

Winners and nominees

Awards 
Winners are listed first and highlighted in boldface.

Career Awards
José Fonseca e Costa
Henrique Espírito Santo
Eduardo Serra

Films with multiple nominations and awards

The following 10 films received multiple nominations:

The following 4 films received multiple awards:

References 

2013 film awards
2014 in Portugal
Portuguese film awards
2010s in Lisbon
October 2014 events in Europe
Events in Lisbon